Todd Woodbridge and Mark Woodforde were the defending champions but did not compete that year.

Sébastien Lareau and Alex O'Brien won in the final 6–3, 6–3 against Ellis Ferreira and Patrick Galbraith.

Seeds

  Todd Woodbridge /  Mark Woodforde (withdrew)
  Byron Black /  Grant Connell (first round)
  Jacco Eltingh /  Paul Haarhuis (quarterfinals)
  Ellis Ferreira /  Patrick Galbraith (final)

Draw

References
 1997 Advanta Championships Doubles Draw

U.S. Pro Indoor
1997 ATP Tour